Many causes of autism have been proposed, but understanding of the theory of causation of autism, or otherwise known as autism spectrum disorder (ASD) is incomplete. Attempts have been made to incorporate the known genetic and environmental causes into a comprehensive causative framework. ASD is a complex developmental condition marked by persistent challenges to social interaction, speech and nonverbal communication, and restricted/repetitive behaviors and its phenotypes vary significantly.

Research indicates that genetic factors predominate. The heritability of autism, however, is complex, and it is typically unclear which genes are involved. In rare cases, autism is associated with agents that cause birth defects. Many other causes have been proposed.

Numerous epidemiological studies have shown no scientific evidence supporting the controversial but popular theory that autism is caused by vaccines.

Background 

Autism involves atypical brain development which often becomes apparent in behavior and social development before a child is three years old. It can be characterized by impairments in social interaction and communication, as well as restricted interests and stereotyped behavior, and the characterization is independent of any underlying neurological defects.  Other characteristics include repetitive-like tasks seen in behavior and sensory interests. This article uses the terms autism and ASD to denote classical autism and the wider dispersion of symptoms and manifestations of autism, respectively.

Autism's theory of causation is incomplete. It has long been presumed that there is a common cause at the genetic, cognitive, and neural levels for autism's characteristic triad of symptoms. However, there is increasing suspicion among researchers that autism does not have a single cause, but is instead a complex disorder with a set of core aspects that have distinct causes, where the interactions between these core aspects determine whether or not autism develops. Different underlying brain dysfunctions have been hypothesized to result in the common symptoms of autism, just as completely different brain types result in intellectual disability. The terms autism or ASDs capture the wide range of its processes at work. Although these distinct causes have been hypothesized to often co-occur, it has also been suggested that the correlation between the causes has been exaggerated. The number of people known to have autism has increased dramatically since the 1980s, at least partly due to changes in diagnostic practice. It is unknown whether prevalence has increased as well.

The consensus among mainstream autism researchers is that genetic factors predominate. Environmental factors that have been claimed to contribute to autism or exacerbate its symptoms, or that may be important to consider in future research, include certain foods, infectious disease, heavy metals, solvents, diesel exhaust, PCBs, phthalates and phenols used in plastic products, pesticides, brominated flame retardants, alcohol, smoking, and illicit drugs. Among these factors, vaccines have attracted much attention, as parents may first become aware of autistic symptoms in their child around the time of a routine vaccination, and parental concern about vaccines has led to a decreasing uptake of childhood immunizations and an increasing likelihood of measles outbreaks. However, there is overwhelming scientific evidence showing no causal association between the measles-mumps-rubella (MMR) vaccine and autism, and there is no scientific evidence that the vaccine preservative thiomersal causes autism.

Genetics 

Genetic factors may be the most significant cause of autism. Early studies of twins had estimated heritability to be over 90%, meaning that genetics explains over 90% of whether a child will develop autism. This may be an overestimation, as later twin studies estimate the heritability at between 60 and 90%. Evidence so far still suggests a strong genetic component, with one of the largest and most recent studies estimating the heritability at 83%. Many of the non-autistic co-twins had learning or social disabilities. For adult siblings the risk for having one or more features of the broader autism phenotype might be as high as 30%.

In spite of the strong heritability, most cases of ASD occur sporadically with no recent evidence of family history. It has been hypothesized that spontaneous de novo mutations in the father's sperm or mother's egg contribute to the likelihood of developing autism. There are two lines of evidence that support this hypothesis. First, individuals with autism have significantly reduced fecundity, they are 20 times less likely to have children than average, thus curtailing the persistence of mutations in ASD genes over multiple generations in a family. Second, the likelihood of having a child develop autism increases with advancing paternal age, and mutations in sperm gradually accumulate throughout a man's life.

The first genes to be definitively shown to contribute to risk for autism were found in the early 1990s by researchers looking at gender-specific forms of autism caused by mutations on the X chromosome.
An expansion of the CGG trinucleotide repeat in the promoter of the gene FMR1 in boys causes fragile X syndrome, and at least 20% of boys with this mutation have behaviors consistent with autism spectrum disorder. Mutations that inactivate the gene MECP2 cause Rett syndrome, which is associated with autistic behaviors in girls, and in boys the mutation is embryonic lethal.

Besides these early examples, the role of de novo mutations in ASD first became evident when DNA microarray technologies reached sufficient resolution to allow the detection of copy number variation (CNV) in the human genome. CNVs are the most common type of structural variation in the genome, consisting of deletions and duplications of DNA that range in size from a kilobase to a few megabases. Microarray analysis has shown that de novo CNVs occur at a significantly higher rate in sporadic cases of autism as compared to the rate in their typically developing siblings and unrelated controls. A series of studies have shown that gene disrupting de novo CNVs occur approximately four times more frequently in ASD than in controls and contribute to approximately 5–10% of cases. Based on these studies, there are predicted to be 130–234 ASD-related CNV loci. The first whole genome sequencing study to comprehensively catalog de novo structural variation at a much higher resolution than DNA microarray studies has shown that the mutation rate is approximately 20% and not elevated in autism compared to sibling controls. However, structural variants in individuals with autism are much larger and four times more likely to disrupt genes, mirroring findings from CNV studies.

CNV studies were closely followed by exome sequencing studies, which sequence the 1–2% of the genome that codes for proteins (the "exome"). These studies found that de novo gene inactivating mutations were observed in approximately 20% of individuals with autism, compared to 10% of unaffected siblings, suggesting the etiology of ASD is driven by these mutations in around 10% of cases. There are predicted to be 350-450 genes that significantly increase susceptibility to ASDs when impacted by inactivating de novo mutations. A further 12% of cases are predicted to be caused by protein altering missense mutations that change an amino acid but do not inactivate a gene. Therefore, approximately 30% of individuals with autism have a spontaneous de novo large CNV that deletes or duplicates genes, or mutation that changes the amino acid code of an individual gene. A further 5–10% of cases have inherited structural variation at loci known to be associated with autism, and these known structural variants may arise de novo in the parents of affected children.

Tens of genes and CNVs have been definitively identified based on the observation of recurrent mutations in different individuals, and suggestive evidence has been found for over 100 others. The Simons Foundation Autism Research Initiative (SFARI) details the evidence for each genetic locus associated with autism.

These early gene and CNV findings have shown that the cognitive and behavioral features associated with each of the underlying mutations is variable. Each mutation is itself associated with a variety of clinical diagnoses, and can also be found in a small percentage of individuals with no clinical diagnosis. Thus the genetic disorders that comprise autism are not autism-specific. The mutations themselves are characterized by considerable variability in clinical outcome and typically only a subset of mutation carriers meet criteria for autism. This variable expressivity results in different individuals with the same mutation varying considerably in the severity of their observed particular trait.

The conclusion of these recent studies of de novo mutation is that the spectrum of autism is breaking up into quanta of individual disorders defined by genetics.

One gene that has been linked to autism is SHANK2. Mutations in this gene act in a dominant fashion. Mutations in this gene appear to cause hyperconnectivity between the neurons.

A study conducted on 42,607 autism cases has identified 60 new genes, five of which had a more moderate impact on autistic symptoms. The related gene variants were often inherited from the participant’s parents.

Metabolic disorders
Selected metabolic conditions which may (rarely) be associated with an ASD appearance are:

Disorders of amino acid metabolism
 Phenylketonuria (untreated)
 Homocystinuria
 Branched-chain ketoacid dehydrogenase kinase deficiency

Disorders of γ-aminobutyric acid metabolism
 Succinic semialdehyde dehydrogenase deficiency

Disorders of cholesterol metabolism
 Smith-Lemli-Opitz syndrome

Disorders associated with cerebral folate deficiency
 Folate receptor 1 gene mutations
 Dihydrofolate reductase deficiency

Disorders of creatine transport or metabolism
 Arginine:glycine amidinotransferase deficiency
 Guanidinoacetate methyltransferase deficiency
 X-linked creatine transporter defect

Disorders of carnitine biosynthesis
 6-N-trimethyllysine dioxygenase deficiency

Disorders of purine and pyrimidine metabolism
 Adenylosuccinate lyase deficiency
 Adenosine deaminase deficiency
 Cytosolic 5'-nucleotidase superactivity
 Dihydropyrimidine dehydrogenase deficiency
 Phosphoribosyl pyrophosphate synthetase superactivity

Lysosomal storage disorders
 Sanfilippo syndrome (mucopolysaccharidosis type III)

Mitochondrial disorders
 Mitochondrial DNA Mutations
 Nuclear DNA mutations

Others
 Biotinidase deficiency
 Urea cycle defects

Epigenetics 

Epigenetic mechanisms may increase the risk of autism. Epigenetic changes occur as a result not of DNA sequence changes but of chromosomal histone modification or modification of the DNA bases. Such modifications are known to be affected by environmental factors, including nutrition, drugs, and mental stress. Interest has been expressed in imprinted regions on chromosomes 15q and 7q.

Most data supports a polygenic, epistatic model, meaning that the disorder is caused by two or more genes and that those genes are interacting in a complex manner.  Several genes, between two and fifteen in number, have been identified and could potentially contribute to disease susceptibility. However, an exact determination of the cause of ASD has yet to be discovered and there probably is not one single genetic cause of any particular set of disorders, leading many researchers to believe that epigenetic mechanisms, such as genomic imprinting or epimutations, may play a major role.

Epigenetic mechanisms can contribute to disease phenotypes.  Epigenetic modifications include DNA cytosine methylation and post-translational modifications to histones.  These mechanisms contribute to regulating gene expression without changing the sequence of the DNA and may be influenced by exposure to environmental factors and may be heritable from parents. Rett syndrome and Fragile X syndrome (FXS) are single gene disorders related to ASD with overlapping symptoms that include deficient neurological development, impaired language and communication, difficulties in social interactions, and stereotyped hand gestures.  It is not uncommon for a patient to be diagnosed with both ASD and Rett syndrome and/or FXS. Epigenetic regulatory mechanisms play the central role in pathogenesis of these two disorders. Rett syndrome is caused by a mutation in the gene that encodes methyl-CpG-binding protein (MECP2), one of the key epigenetic regulators of gene expression. MeCP2 binds methylated cytosine residues in DNA and interacts with complexes that remodel chromatin into repressive structures. On the other hand, FXS is caused by mutations that are both genetic and epigenetic.  Expansion of the CGG repeat in the 5'-untranslated region of the FMR1 genes leads to susceptibility of epigenetic silencing, leading to loss of gene expression.

Genomic imprinting may also contribute to ASD.  Genomic imprinting is another example of epigenetic regulation of gene expression.  In this instance, the epigenetic modification(s) causes the offspring to express the maternal copy of a gene or the paternal copy of a gene, but not both.  The imprinted gene is silenced through epigenetic mechanisms.  Candidate genes and susceptibility alleles for autism are identified using a combination of techniques, including genome-wide and targeted analyses of allele sharing in sib-pairs, using association studies and transmission disequilibrium testing (TDT) of functional and/or positional candidate genes and examination of novel and recurrent cytogenetic aberrations.  Results from numerous studies have identified several genomic regions known to be subject to imprinting, candidate genes, and gene-environment interactions.  Particularly, chromosomes 15q and 7q appear to be epigenetic hotspots in contributing to ASD. Also, genes on the X chromosome may play an important role, as in Rett Syndrome.

An important basis for ASD causation is also the over- or underproduction of brain permanent cells (neurons, oligodendrocytes, and astrocytes) by the neural precursor cells during fetal development.

Prenatal environment 
The risk of autism is associated with several prenatal risk factors, including advanced age in either parent, diabetes, bleeding, and use of psychiatric drugs in the mother during pregnancy. Autism has been linked to birth defect agents acting during the first eight weeks from conception, though these cases are rare. If the mother of the child is dealing with autoimmune conditions or disorders while pregnant, it may affect if the child developed autism. All of these factors can cause inflammation or impair immune signaling in one way or another.

Obstructive sleep apnea in pregnancy 
Sleep apnea can result in intermittent hypoxia and has been increasing in prevalence due in part to the obesity epidemic. The known maternal risk factors for autism diagnosis in her offspring are similar to the risk factors for sleep apnea. For example, advanced maternal age, maternal obesity, maternal type 2 diabetes and maternal hypertension all increase the risk of autism in her offspring. Likewise, these are all known risk factors for sleep apnea.

One animal study found behaviour of offspring exhibited autism-like traits when rats were subjected to intermittent hypoxia during gestation, replicating the oxygen drops seen in sleep apnea. A human study found that gestational sleep apnea was associated with low reading test scores in children and that this effect may be mediated by an increased risk of the child having sleep apnea themselves. Another study reported low social development scores in 64% of infants born to mothers with sleep apnea compared to 25% of infants born to controls, suggesting sleep apnea in pregnancy may have an effect on offspring neurodevelopment. There was also an increase in the amount of snoring the mothers with sleep apnea reported in their infants when compared to controls. Children with sleep apnea have "hyperactivity, attention problems, aggressivity, lower social competency, poorer communication, and/or diminished adaptive skills". One study found significant improvements in ADHD-like symptoms, aggression, social problems and thought problems in autistic children who underwent adenotonsillectomy for sleep apnea.  Sleep problems in autism have been linked in a study to brain changes, particularly in the hippocampus, though this study does not prove causation. A common presentation of sleep apnea in children with autism is insomnia.

Infectious processes 
Prenatal viral infection has been called the principal non-genetic cause of autism. Prenatal exposure to rubella or cytomegalovirus activates the mother's immune response and may greatly increase the risk for autism in mice. Congenital rubella syndrome is the most convincing environmental cause of autism. Infection-associated immunological events in early pregnancy may affect neural development more than infections in late pregnancy, not only for autism, but also for psychiatric disorders of presumed neurodevelopmental origin, notably schizophrenia.

Environmental agents 
Teratogens are environmental agents that cause birth defects. Some agents that are theorized to cause birth defects have also been suggested as potential autism risk factors, although there is little to no scientific evidence to back such claims. These include exposure of the embryo to valproic acid, paracetamol, thalidomide or misoprostol. These cases are rare. Questions have also been raised whether ethanol (grain alcohol) increases autism risk, as part of fetal alcohol syndrome or alcohol-related birth defects. All known teratogens appear to act during the first eight weeks from conception, and though this does not exclude the possibility that autism can be initiated or affected later, it is strong evidence that autism arises very early in development.

Autoimmune and inflammatory diseases 
Maternal inflammatory and autoimmune diseases can damage embryonic and fetal tissues, aggravating a genetic problem or damaging the nervous system.

Other maternal conditions 
Thyroid problems that lead to thyroxine deficiency in the mother in weeks 8–12 of pregnancy have been postulated to produce changes in the fetal brain leading to autism. Thyroxine deficiencies can be caused by inadequate iodine in the diet, and by environmental agents that interfere with iodine uptake or act against thyroid hormones. Possible environmental agents include flavonoids in food, tobacco smoke, and most herbicides. This hypothesis has not been tested.

Diabetes in the mother during pregnancy is a significant risk factor for autism; a 2009 meta-analysis found that gestational diabetes was associated with a twofold increased risk. A 2014 review also found that maternal diabetes was significantly associated with an increased risk of ASD. Although diabetes causes metabolic and hormonal abnormalities and oxidative stress, no biological mechanism is known for the association between gestational diabetes and autism risk.

Maternal obesity during pregnancy may also increase the risk of autism, although further study is needed.

Maternal malnutrition during preconception and pregnancy influences fetal neurodevelopment. Intrauterine growth restriction is associated with ASD, in both term and preterm infants.

Other in utero 
It has been hypothesized that folic acid taken during pregnancy could play a role in reducing cases of autism by modulating gene expression through an epigenetic mechanism. This hypothesis is supported by multiple studies.

Prenatal stress, consisting of exposure to life events or environmental factors that distress an expectant mother, has been hypothesized to contribute to autism, possibly as part of a gene-environment interaction. Autism has been reported to be associated with prenatal stress both with retrospective studies that examined stressors such as job loss and family discord, and with natural experiments involving prenatal exposure to storms; animal studies have reported that prenatal stress can disrupt brain development and produce behaviors resembling symptoms of autism. However, other studies have cast doubts on this association, notably population based studies in England and Sweden finding no link between stressful life events and ASD.

The fetal testosterone theory hypothesizes that higher levels of testosterone in the amniotic fluid of mothers pushes brain development towards improved ability to see patterns and analyze complex systems while diminishing communication and empathy, emphasizing "male" traits over "female", or in E-S theory terminology, emphasizing "systemizing" over "empathizing". One project has published several reports suggesting that high levels of fetal testosterone could produce behaviors relevant to those seen in autism.

Based in part on animal studies, diagnostic ultrasounds administered during pregnancy have been hypothesized to increase the child's risk of autism. This hypothesis is not supported by independently published research, and examination of children whose mothers received an ultrasound has failed to find evidence of harmful effects.

Some research suggests that maternal exposure to selective serotonin reuptake inhibitors during pregnancy is associated with an increased risk of autism, but it remains unclear whether there is a causal link between the two. There is evidence, for example, that this association may be an artifact of confounding by maternal mental illness.

Perinatal environment 
Autism is associated with some perinatal and obstetric conditions. A 2007 review of risk factors found associated obstetric conditions that included low birth weight and gestation duration, and hypoxia during childbirth. This association does not demonstrate a causal relationship. As a result, an underlying cause could explain both autism and these associated conditions. There is growing evidence that perinatal exposure to air pollution may be a risk factor for autism, although this evidence has methodological limitations, including a small number of studies and failure to control for potential confounding factors. A few studies have found an association between autism and frequent use of acetaminophen (e.g. Tylenol, Paracetamol) by the mother during pregnancy.  This association does not necessarily demonstrate a causal relationship.

Postnatal environment 
A wide variety of postnatal contributors to autism have been proposed, including gastrointestinal or immune system abnormalities, allergies, and exposure of children to drugs, infection, certain foods, or heavy metals. The evidence for these risk factors is anecdotal and has not been confirmed by reliable studies.

Paracetamol 

Paracetamol has been suggested as a possible risk factor for autism. A study has found that male children exposed to Paracetamol before the age of 2 years old are associated with being at risk for being diagnosed with ASD.

Amygdala neurons 
This theory hypothesizes that an early developmental failure involving the amygdala cascades on the development of cortical areas that mediate social perception in the visual domain. The fusiform face area of the ventral stream is implicated. The idea is that it is involved in social knowledge and social cognition, and that the deficits in this network are instrumental in causing autism.

Autoimmune disease 
This theory hypothesizes that autoantibodies that target the brain or elements of brain metabolism may cause or exacerbate autism. It is related to the maternal infection theory, except that it postulates that the effect is caused by the individual's own antibodies, possibly due to an environmental trigger after birth. It is also related to several other hypothesized causes; for example, viral infection has been hypothesized to cause autism via an autoimmune mechanism.

Interactions between the immune system and the nervous system begin early during embryogenesis, and successful neurodevelopment depends on a balanced immune response. It is possible that aberrant immune activity during critical periods of neurodevelopment is part of the mechanism of some forms of ASD. A small percentage of autism cases are associated with infection, usually before birth. Results from immune studies have been contradictory. Some abnormalities have been found in specific subgroups, and some of these have been replicated. It is not known whether these abnormalities are relevant to the pathology of autism, for example, by infection or autoimmunity, or whether they are secondary to the disease processes. As autoantibodies are found in diseases other than ASD, and are not always present in ASD, the relationship between immune disturbances and autism remains unclear and controversial. A 2015 systematic review and meta-analysis found that children with a family history of autoimmune diseases were at a greater risk of autism compared to children without such a history.

When an underlying maternal autoimmune disease is present, antibodies circulating to the fetus could contribute to the development of autism spectrum disorders.

Gastrointestinal connection 
Gastrointestinal problems are one of the most commonly associated medical disorders in people with autism. These are linked to greater social impairment, irritability, behavior and sleep problems, language impairments and mood changes, so the theory that they are an overlap syndrome has been postulated. Studies indicate that gastrointestinal inflammation, food allergies, gluten-related disorders (celiac disease, wheat allergy, non-celiac gluten sensitivity), visceral hypersensitivity, dysautonomia and gastroesophageal reflux are the mechanisms that possibly link both.

A 2016 review concludes that enteric nervous system abnormalities might play a role in several neurological disorders, including  autism. Neural connections and the immune system are a pathway that may allow diseases originated in the intestine to spread to the brain. A 2018 review suggests that the frequent association of gastrointestinal disorders and autism is due to abnormalities of the gut–brain axis.

The "leaky gut syndrome" hypothesis developed by Andrew Wakefield, known for his fraudulent study on another cause of autism, is popular among parents of children with autism. It is based on the idea that defects in the intestinal barrier produce an excessive increase in intestinal permeability, allowing substances present in the intestine (including bacteria, environmental toxins, and food antigens) to pass into the blood. The data supporting this theory are limited and contradictory, since both increased intestinal permeability and normal permeability have been documented in people with autism. Studies with mice provide some support to this theory and suggest the importance of intestinal flora, demonstrating that the normalization of the intestinal barrier was associated with an improvement in some of the ASD-like behaviours. Studies on subgroups of people with ASD showed the presence of high plasma levels of zonulin, a protein that regulates permeability opening the "pores" of the intestinal wall, as well as intestinal dysbiosis (reduced levels of Bifidobacteria and increased abundance of Akkermansia muciniphila, Escherichia coli, Clostridia and Candida fungi that promote the production of proinflammatory cytokines, all of which produces excessive intestinal permeability. This allows passage of bacterial endotoxins from the gut into the bloodstream, stimulating liver cells to secrete tumor necrosis factor alpha (TNFα), which modulates blood–brain barrier permeability. Studies on ASD people showed that TNFα cascades produce proinflammatory cytokines, leading to peripheral inflammation and activation of microglia in the brain, which indicates neuroinflammation. In addition, neuroactive opioid peptides from digested foods have been shown to leak into the bloodstream and permeate the blood–brain barrier, influencing neural cells and causing autistic symptoms. (See Endogenous opiate precursor theory)

After a preliminary 1998 study of three children with ASD treated with secretin infusion reported improved GI function and dramatic improvement in behavior, many parents sought secretin treatment and a black market for the hormone developed quickly. Later studies found secretin clearly ineffective in treating autism.

Endogenous opiate precursor theory 

In 1979, Jaak Panksepp proposed a connection between autism and opiates, noting that injections of minute quantities of opiates in young laboratory animals induce symptoms similar to those observed among autistic children. The possibility of a relationship between autism and the consumption of gluten and casein was first articulated by Kalle Reichelt in 1991.

Opiate theory hypothesizes that autism is the result of a metabolic disorder in which opioid peptides gliadorphin (aka gluteomorphin) and casomorphin, produced through metabolism of gluten (present in wheat and related cereals) and casein (present in dairy products), pass through an abnormally permeable intestinal wall and then proceed to exert an effect on neurotransmission through binding with opioid receptors. It has been postulated that the resulting excess of opioids affects brain maturation, and causes autistic symptoms, including behavioural difficulties, attention problems, and alterations in communicative capacity and social and cognitive functioning.

Although high levels of these opioids are eliminated in the urine, it has been suggested that a small part of them cross into the brain causing interference of signal transmission and disruption of normal activity. Three studies have reported that urine samples of people with autism show an increased 24-hour peptide excretion. A study with a control group found no appreciable differences in opioid levels in urine samples of people with autism compared to controls. Two studies showed an increased opioid levels in cerebrospinal fluid of people with autism.

The theory further states that removing opiate precursors from a child's diet may allow time for these behaviors to cease, and neurological development in very young children to resume normally. As of 2014 there is no good evidence that a gluten-free diet is of benefit as a standard treatment for autism. Problems observed in studies carried out include the suspicion that there were transgressions of the diet because the participants asked for food containing gluten or casein to siblings and peers; and the lack of a washout period, that could diminish the effectiveness of the treatment if gluten or casein peptides have a long term residual effect, which is especially relevant in studies of short duration. In the subset of people who have gluten sensitivity there is limited evidence that suggests that a gluten-free diet may improve some autistic behaviors.

Lack of vitamin D 
The hypothesis that vitamin D deficiency has a role in autism is biologically plausible, but not researched. Vitamin D deficiency is found more often in children with autism than in children who are considered to be healthy.

Lead 
Lead poisoning has been suggested as a possible risk factor for autism, as the lead blood levels of autistic children has been reported to be significantly higher than typical.
The atypical eating  behaviors of autistic children, along with habitual mouthing and pica, make it hard to determine whether increased lead levels are a cause or a consequence of autism.

Locus coeruleus–noradrenergic system 
This theory hypothesizes that autistic behaviors depend at least in part on a developmental dysregulation that results in impaired function of the locus coeruleus–noradrenergic (LC-NA) system. The LC-NA system is heavily involved in arousal and attention; for example, it is related to the brain's acquisition and use of environmental cues.

Mercury 
This theory hypothesizes that autism is associated with mercury poisoning, based on perceived similarity of symptoms and reports of mercury or its biomarkers in some autistic children. This view has gained little traction in the scientific community as the typical symptoms of mercury toxicity are significantly different from symptoms seen in autism.  The principal source of human exposure to organic mercury is via fish consumption and for inorganic mercury is dental amalgams. The evidence so far is indirect for the association between autism and mercury exposure after birth, as no direct test has been reported, and there is no evidence of an association between autism and postnatal exposure to any neurotoxicant.  A meta-analysis published in 2007 concluded that there was no link between mercury and autism.

Oxidative stress 
Oxidative stress, oxidative DNA damage and disruptions of DNA repair have been postulated to play a role in the aetiopathology of both ASD and schizophrenia.  This theory hypothesizes that toxicity and oxidative stress may cause autism in some cases. Evidence includes genetic effects on metabolic pathways, reduced antioxidant capacity, enzyme changes, and enhanced biomarkers for oxidative stress; however, the overall evidence is weaker than it is for involvement oxidative stress with disorders such as schizophrenia. One theory is that stress damages Purkinje cells in the cerebellum after birth, and it is possible that glutathione is involved.  Autistic children have lower levels of total glutathione, and higher levels of oxidized glutathione. Based on this theory, antioxidants may be a useful treatment for autism.

Social construct 
The social construct theory says that the boundary between normal and abnormal is subjective and arbitrary, so autism does not exist as an objective entity, but only as a social construct. It further argues that autistic individuals themselves have a way of being that is partly socially constructed.

Asperger syndrome and high-functioning autism are particular targets of the theory that social factors determine what it means to be autistic. The theory hypothesizes that individuals with these diagnoses inhabit the identities that have been ascribed to them, and promote their sense of well-being by resisting or appropriating autistic ascriptions.

Lynn Waterhouse suggests that autism has been reified, in that social processes have endowed it with more reality than is justified by the scientific evidence.

Viral infection 
Many studies have presented evidence for and against association of autism with viral infection after birth. Laboratory rats infected with Borna disease virus show some symptoms similar to those of autism but blood studies of autistic children show no evidence of infection by this virus. Members of the herpes virus family may have a role in autism, but the evidence so far is anecdotal. Viruses have long been suspected as triggers for immune-mediated diseases such as multiple sclerosis but showing a direct role for viral causation is difficult in those diseases, and mechanisms, whereby viral infections could lead to autism, are speculative.

Evolutionary explanations
Research exploring the evolutionary benefits of autism and associated genes has suggested that autistic people may have played a "unique role in technological spheres and understanding of natural systems" in the course of human development. It has been suggested that it may have arisen as "a slight trade off for other traits that are seen as highly advantageous", providing "advantages in tool making and mechanical thinking", with speculation that the condition may "reveal itself to be the result of a balanced polymorphism, like sickle cell anemia, that is advantageous in a certain mixture of genes and disadvantageous in specific combinations".

In 2011, a paper in Evolutionary Psychology proposed that autistic traits, including increased abilities for spatial intelligence, concentration and memory, could have been naturally selected to enable self-sufficient foraging in a more solitary environment, referred to as the "Solitary Forager Hypothesis". However, the author notes that such individuals "were probably not completely solitary; rather, they may have done much of their foraging alone and reconvened intermittently with familiar individuals." A 2016 paper examines Asperger syndrome as "an alternative pro-social adaptive strategy" which may have developed as a result of the emergence of "collaborative morality" in the context of small-scale hunter-gathering, i.e. where "a positive social reputation for making a contribution to group wellbeing and survival" becomes more important than complex social understanding. The authors further suggest that "mutual interdependence of different social strategies" may have "contributed to the rise of innovation and large scale social networks".

Discredited theories

Refrigerator mother 

Psychologist Bruno Bettelheim believed that autism was linked to early childhood trauma, and his work was highly influential for decades both in the medical and popular spheres. In his discredited theory, he blamed the mothers of individuals with autism for having caused their child's condition through the withholding of affection. Leo Kanner, who first described autism, suggested that parental coldness might contribute to autism. Although Kanner eventually renounced the theory, Bettelheim put an almost exclusive emphasis on it in both his medical and his popular books. Treatments based on these theories failed to help children with autism, and after Bettelheim's death, his reported rates of cure (around 85%) were found to be fraudulent.

Vaccines 
Scientific studies have consistently refuted a causal relationship between vaccinations and autism.  Despite this, some parents believe that vaccinations cause autism; they therefore delay or avoid immunizing their children (for example, under the "vaccine overload" hypothesis that giving many vaccines at once may overwhelm a child's immune system and lead to autism, even though this hypothesis has no scientific evidence and is biologically implausible). Diseases such as measles can cause severe disabilities and even death, so the risk of death or disability for an unvaccinated child is higher than the risk for a child who has been vaccinated. Despite medical evidence, antivaccine activism continues. A developing tactic is the "promotion of irrelevant research [as] an active aggregation of several questionable or peripherally related research studies in an attempt to justify the science underlying a questionable claim."

MMR vaccine 

The MMR vaccine as a cause of autism is one of the most extensively debated hypotheses regarding the origins of autism. Andrew Wakefield et al. reported a study of 12 children who had autism and bowel symptoms, in some cases reportedly with onset after MMR.  Although the paper, which was later retracted by the journal, concluded "We did not prove an association between measles, mumps, and rubella vaccine and the syndrome described," Wakefield nevertheless suggested a false notion during a 1998 press conference that giving children the vaccines in three separate doses would be safer than a single dose. Administering the vaccines in three separate doses does not reduce the chance of adverse effects, and it increases the opportunity for infection by the two diseases not immunized against first.

In 2004, the interpretation of a causal link between MMR vaccine and autism was formally retracted by ten of Wakefield's twelve co-authors. The retraction followed an investigation by The Sunday Times, which stated that Wakefield "acted dishonestly and irresponsibly". The Centers for Disease Control and Prevention, the Institute of Medicine of the National Academy of Sciences, and the U.K. National Health Service have all concluded that there is no evidence of a link between the MMR vaccine and autism.

In February 2010, The Lancet, which published Wakefield's study, fully retracted it after an independent auditor found the study to be flawed. In January 2011, an investigation published in the journal BMJ described the Wakefield study as the result of deliberate fraud and manipulation of data.

Thiomersal (thimerosal) 

Perhaps the best-known hypothesis involving mercury and autism involves the use of the mercury-based compound thiomersal, a preservative that has been phased out from most childhood vaccinations in developed countries including US and the EU. There is no scientific evidence for a causal connection between thiomersal and autism, but parental concern about a relationship between thiomersal and vaccines has led to decreasing rates of childhood immunizations and increasing likelihood of disease outbreaks. In 1999, due to concern about the dose of  mercury infants were being exposed to, the U.S. Public Health Service recommended that thiomersal be removed from childhood vaccines, and by 2002 the flu vaccine was the only childhood vaccine containing more than trace amounts of thimerosal. Despite this, autism rates did not decrease after the removal of thimerosal, in the US or other countries that also removed thimerosal from their childhood vaccines.

A causal link between thimerosal and autism has been rejected by international scientific and medical professional bodies including the American Medical Association, the American Academy of Pediatrics, the American College of Medical Toxicology, the Canadian Paediatric Society, the U.S. National Academy of Sciences, the Food and Drug Administration, Centers for Disease Control and Prevention, the World Health Organization, the Public Health Agency of Canada, and the European Medicines Agency.

See also 
 List of topics characterized as pseudoscience
 Sex differences in autism

References 

 
Social constructionism